Gilbert Clifford Cox (5 July 1908 – 31 March 1974) was an English cricketer who played two first-class games for Worcestershire, his career at that level lasting for a single week in 1935 when he kept wicket for the county in place of the usual incumbent Bernard Quaife.

He did not have a successful time, making no stumpings or catches in either game he played in, and Worcestershire lost both matches by an innings. The 19 he made in the first innings on his debut against Lancashire remained his top score.

Cox was born in Stroud, Gloucestershire; he died in Alcester, Warwickshire aged 65.

External links 
 
 Statistical summary from CricketArchive

1908 births
1974 deaths
Cricketers from Stroud
English cricketers
People from Alcester
Worcestershire cricketers
Wicket-keepers